John Curtis (born 9 July 1967) is a Canadian sailor. He competed in the Tornado event at the 2004 Summer Olympics.

References

External links
 

1967 births
Living people
Canadian male sailors (sport)
Olympic sailors of Canada
Sailors at the 2004 Summer Olympics – Tornado
Sportspeople from Montreal